The Loudenslager Laser 200 is a single place, mid wing, aerobatic monoplane designed and built by Leo Loudenslager. It is constructed of steel tubing and covered with Ceconite fabric.

Design and development
In an effort to perfect the design of the Stephens Akro, Loudenslager conducted modifications to increase roll rate, climb rate, and overall strength while decreasing the empty weight. These modifications included grinding away unnecessary bosses and casting flash, which removed 12 pounds from the engine alone, as well as spot drilling the canopy. A high strength wing was achieved using a single piece wooden spar. Longer full-span ailerons greatly increased the roll rate. The resulting aircraft contained only 10% of the original design, the rest being Loudenslager's own work. The design greatly influenced the next generation of aerobatic aircraft such as the Extra 300, which dominated aerobatics throughout 1990's.

Operational history
The Laser 200 was flown to victory in seven US National Aerobatic Championships, and one World Aerobatic Championship.

Variants
Stephens Akro
Original Variant

Specifications

References

External links
 Smithsonian

Aircraft first flown in 1971
1970s United States sport aircraft
Aerobatic aircraft